Ernest John 'Snowy' Martin (3 June 1903 – 7 September 1996) was an Australian rules footballer who played for Carlton and Essendon in the Victorian Football League (VFL) during the 1920s.

Recruited from Carlton District, Martin was a wingman and could only manage to play four games in three years at Carlton. He spent the 1926 and 1927 seasons with Coburg in the VFA and participated in back to back premierships. His performances in 1927 made him the first Coburg player to win a Recorder Cup.

Martin had another VFL stint in 1928, this time at Essendon, but struggled with a knee injury in his two seasons and eventually returned to Coburg.

References

Ernie Martin's playing statistics from The VFA Project
Holmesby, Russell and Main, Jim (2007). The Encyclopedia of AFL Footballers. 7th ed. Melbourne: Bas Publishing.

1903 births
1996 deaths
Carlton Football Club players
Essendon Football Club players
Coburg Football Club players
Australian rules footballers from Victoria (Australia)